1956 college football season may refer to:

 1956 NCAA University Division football season
 1956 NCAA College Division football season
 1956 NAIA football season